Pishgaman (also Romanized as Pīshgamān; also known as Pamish, Pāynīsh, and Peshgomān) is a village in Khvoresh Rostam-e Jonubi Rural District, Khvoresh Rostam District, Khalkhal County, Ardabil Province, Iran. At the 2006 census, its population was 55, in 11 families.

References 

Towns and villages in Khalkhal County